Ministry of water resources may refer to:

 Ministry of Water Resources (Bangladesh)
 Ministry of Water Resources (India)
 Ministry of Water Resources (Iraq)
 Minister of Water Resources (Nigeria)
 Ministry of Water Resources (Pakistan)
 Ministry of Water Resources of the People's Republic of China
 Ministry of Water Resources (Syria)